The Nigerian National Assembly delegation from Nasarawa State comprises three Senators and five Representatives.

9th Assembly (2019–2023)

The 9th National Assembly (2019–2023) 
The All Progressives Congress (APC) won all three Senate seat.

Senators representing Nasarawa State in the 9th Assembly were
representatives
Abdulkarim usman:PDP: akwang nasarawa eggon and wamba
Abdulmumin Mohammed: APC: nasarawa/Toto
Abubakar hassan nalaraba:awe/doma/keana
Abubakar sarki:obi: lafia

8th Assembly (2015–2019)

The 8th National Assembly (2015–2019)

Senators representing Nasarawa State in the 8th Assembly were

6th Assembly (2007–2011)

The 6th National Assembly (2007–2011) was inaugurated on 5 June 2007.
The People's Democratic Party (PDP) won two Senate and four House seats.
The All Nigeria Peoples Party (ANPP) won one Senate and one House seat.

Senators representing Nasarawa State in the 6th Assembly were:

Representatives in the 6th Assembly were:

See also
Senate of Nigeria
Nigerian National Assembly

References

Nasarawa State
National Assembly (Nigeria) delegations by state